Bertis Edwin Downs IV (born July 13, 1956) is an American entertainment lawyer. He originally provided legal counsel (particularly for initial contracts), and then became both counselor and manager, for the rock band R.E.M., taking over from the band's long-term manager Jefferson Holt. He is usually credited simply as the band's "Advisor".

Biography

Career with R.E.M.
R.E.M.'s drummer Bill Berry instigated Downs' connection with the band. In 1978, John Huie, a rep for the booking company Berry worked for at the time, suggested Berry look up Downs, whom he knew from Davidson College who had since graduated and was then in law school at the University of Georgia.

Downs attended an R.E.M. show at the 11.11 Koffee Club in Athens, Georgia on April 19, 1980. By that time, Downs also knew Peter Buck from Wuxtry Records, a downtown Athens shop where he would buy Neil Young records. Recalling events nineteen years later on VH1's Behind the Music, Downs said, "I thought they were great". Downs was so impressed that he told the band that they would one day be bigger than the Beatles. He and the band immediately forged a friendship. "They started asking me questions about copyright issues, trademark issues, the first time they had a recording agreement they needed me to have a look at", Downs said. "They knew that I was just out of law school and was just getting started as a lawyer, and I certainly didn't claim any particular expertise. I learned by the seat of my pants. I worked with them as a volunteer, just helping out, and gradually over the next couple of years it became more like a real job, and, all these years later, that's kind of still what it is."

Education and academic career
Downs graduated cum laude from Davidson College in 1978 with a Bachelor of Arts degree in history. In 1981, he graduated from the University of Georgia School of Law. He was a law clerk for Senior Judge Wilson Cowen of the United States Court of Appeals for the Federal Circuit. He is currently an adjunct professor in the UGA law school teaching entertainment law and music law.

References

External links

 Profile at University of Georgia
 Interview with Downs on state of the music business, 2007

1956 births
Davidson College alumni
Georgia (U.S. state) lawyers
Living people
People from Athens, Georgia
R.E.M. members
University of Georgia School of Law alumni
University of Georgia faculty
People for the American Way people
Talent managers